American Friends of the Hebrew University (AFHU) is a non-profit organization headquartered in New York City which promotes and supports the Hebrew University of Jerusalem. American businessman and philanthropist Felix M. Warburg founded AFHU in June 1925 and served as its first chairman. The organization was originally named the "American Advisory Committee" but changed its name to what it is currently known as in 1931.

In December 2008, AFHU launched its inaugural "Einstein Award" and gala. Microsoft founder and chairman Bill Gates was the first recipient.

References

External links
 

Hebrew University of Jerusalem
1925 establishments in the United States